

Paragliding

Paragliding World Cup

 March 9 – 16: 2016 Paragliding World Cup Brazil in  Castelo
 Overall winner:  Félix Rodriguez (4450 points)
 Women's winner:  Keiko Hiraki (4066 points)
 June 4 – 11: 2016 Paragliding World Cup - Italy in  Gemona del Friuli
 Overall winner:  Andreas Malecki (1463 points)
 Women's winner:  Silvia Buzzi Ferraris (1345 points)
 July 2 – 9: 2016 Paragliding World Cup - Portugal in  Serra da Estrela
 Overall winner:  Donizete Baldessar Lemos (2447 points)
 Women's winner:  Keiko Hiraki (2172 points)
 September 3 – 10: 2016 Paragliding World Cup - France in  Saint-André-les-Alpes
 Overall winner:  Maxime Pinot (2184 points)
 Women's winner:  Kirsty Cameron (1496 points)
 October 1 – 8: 2016 Paragliding World Cup (final) in  Saint-Leu
 Overall winner:  Michael Küffer (2832 points)
 Women's winner:  Klaudia Bulgakow (2259 points)

Paragliding Accuracy World Cup

 May 5 – 8: Paragliding Accuracy World Cup #1 in  Berane
 Overall winner:  Goran Đurković
 Women's winner:  Tamara Kostić
 May 10 – 15: Paragliding Accuracy World Cup #2 in  Vlorë
 Overall winner:  Mile Jovanoski
 Women's winner:  Tamara Kostić
 August 5 – 7: Paragliding Accuracy World Cup #3 in  Lombok
 Overall winner:  Permadi Chandra
 Women's winner:  Nunnapat Phuchong
 August 11 – 15: Paragliding Accuracy World Cup #4 in  Taitung County
 Overall winner:  Zhifeng Zhu
 Women's winner:  Nunnapat Phuchong

International and Continental events

 May 27 – June 3: 3rd FAI Asian Paragliding Accuracy Championship in  Taldykorgan
 Overall winner:  Tanapat Leangaiem 
 Teams winner: 
 July 10 – 17: 5th FAI European Paragliding Accuracy Championship in  Paluknys
 Men's winner:  Matjaž Sluga
 Women's winner:  Tamara Kostić
 July 16 – 23: XXXIII Guarnieri International Trophy - Pre-World 2016 in  Pedavena
 Overall winner:  Federico Nevastro
 Women's winner:  Seiko Fukuoka-Naville
 August 8 – 20: 14th FAI European Paragliding Championship in  Kruševo
 Overall winner:  Honorin Hamard
 Women's winner:  Seiko Fukuoka-Naville
 Teams winners:  (Honorin Hamard, Julien Wirtz, Maxime Pinot, Pierre Remy, Alexandre Jofresa, Seiko Fukuoka-Naville)
 August 26 – September 4: 2nd FAI World Paragliding Championships in  Montmin / Doussard
 Men's winner:  François Ragolski
 Women's winner:  Christina Kolb

Parachuting
 January 15 – 17: Para-ski World Cup #1 in  St Johann im Pongau/Alpendorf
 Men's winner:  Ule Uroš
 Women's winner:  Magdalena Schwertl
 Junior mix winner:  Sebastian Graser
 Master mix winner:  Alic Gernot
 Overall teams winners: 
 February 19 – 21: Para-ski World Cup #2 in  Unterammergau
 Men's winner:  Sebastian Graser
 Women's winner:  Magdalena Schwertl
 Junior mix winner:  Sebastian Graser
 Master mix winner:  Marco Valente
 Overall teams winners: 
 March 4 – 6: Para-ski World Cup #3 in  Vrchlabí/Krkonoše
 Men's winner:  Alessandro Di Prisco
 Women's winner:  Magdalena Schwertl
 Junior mix winner:  Sebastian Graser
 Master mix winner:  Tomas Saurer
 Overall teams winners: 
 no date set from #4 Para-ski World Cup in  Srednja Vas v Bohinju
 July 17 – 29: 40th CISM World Military Parachuting Championship in  Kubinka
 Individual Accuracy winners:  Dmitrii Mastafanov (m) /  Olga Lepezina (f)
 Individual Style winners:  Libor Jirousek (m) /  Olga Lepezina (f)
 Overall Results winners:  Dmitrii Mastafanov (m) /  Olga Lepezina (f)
 Junior Individual Style winners:  Andrey Izimetov (m) /  Léocadie Ollivier de Pury (f)
 Junior Individual Accuracy winners:  Gao Tinabo (m) /  Darja Shastakovich (f)
 Junior Overall Results winners:  Gao Tinabo (m) /  Darja Shastakovich (f)
 Formation Skydiving winners:  (m) /  (f)
 Team Accuracy winners:  (Tamas Banszki, Szaboles Gal, Gabor Hirschler, Tamás Varga, István Asztalos) (m) /  (Nataliya Nikitsiuk, Yuliya Fiodarava, Aksana Famina, Natalia Zimina, Valeryia Osipava) (f)
 Teams Overall Results winners:  (m) /  (f)
 August 20 – 27: 6th FAI World Canopy Piloting Championships in  Farnham
 Overall winner:  Christopher Bobo
 Accuracy winners:  Curtis Bartholomew &  Eric Philippe
 Distance here was cancelled
 Speed winner:  Christopher Bobo
 September 11 – 20: 2016 FAI World Parachuting Championships - Mondial in  Chicago
 Freefall Style winners:  Libor Jirousek (m) /  Olga Lepezina (f)
 Speed Skydiving winner:  Henrik Raimer
Accuracy Landing
Individual Accuracy Landing winners:  Uroš Ban (m) /  Nataliya Nikitsiuk (f)
 Junior Individual Accuracy winners:  Sebastian Graser (m) /  Tiantian ZHAO
 Team Accuracy Landing winners:  (m) /  (f)
Formation Skydiving
 4 Way Formation winners:  (m) /  (f)
 8 Way Formation winners: 
 Vertical Formation winners: 
Artistic Events
 Artistic Freefly winners:  1
 Artistic Freestyle winners:  2
Canopy Formation
 2 Way Sequential winners:  1
 4 Way Sequential winners: 
 4-Way Rotation winners: 
 October 11 – 16: 2nd FAI World Cup of Indoor Skydiving in  Warsaw
 Open Freestyle winner:  Inka Tiitto
 Junior Freestyle winner:  Kyra Poh
 Dynamic 2-WAY winners: 
 4 Way Formation winners:  (m) /  1 (f); Junior winners: 
 Vertical Formation winners: 
 November 3 – 6: 1st FAI World Wingsuit Performance Flying Championships in  Zephyrhills, Florida
 Winner:  Chris Geiler

Ultralight aviation
 June 9 – 18: 2nd FAI European Paramotor Slalom Championships in  Bornos
 PF1 Class winner:  Alexandre Mateos
 Trike Class winner:  Alexandre Mateos
 Racing teams winners:  (Alexandre Mateos, Nicolas Aubert, Jérémy Penone, François Blanc)
 Nations winners:  (Bartosz Nowicki, Wojtek Bógdał, Marcin Bernat, Paweł Kozarzewski, Piotr Ficek, Szymon Winkler, Krzysztof Romicki)
 August 20 – 27: 15th FAI World Microlight Championships in  Popham Airfield
 RAL 1 T winner: 
 RAL 2 T winner: 
 RGL 2 T winner: 
 RWL 1 T winner: 
 RWL 2 T winner: 
 August 20 – 27: 9th FAI World Paramotor Championships in  Popham Airfield
 Winners: , 2. , 3.

Hang gliding
 July 16 – 30: 19th FAI European Hang Gliding Class 1 Championship in  Kruševo
 Winner:  Christian Ciech
 Team winners:  (Christian Ciech, Alessandro Ploner, Suan Selenati, Filippo Oppici, Tullio Gervasoni) 
 July 17 – 30: 7th FAI World Hang Gliding Class 5 Championship in  Kruševo
 Winner:  Tim Grabowski
 Team winners:  (Christopher Friedl, Wolfgang Kothgasser, Walter Geppert)

Gliding

Grand Prix gliding
 January 23 – 30: 2016 FAI Qualifying Sailplane GP #1 in  Vitacura
 Winner:  Carlos Rocca
 April 17 – 23: 2016 FAI Qualifying Sailplane GP #2 in  Cerdanya
 Winner:  Louis Bouderlique
 May 1 – 8: 2016 FAI Qualifying Sailplane GP #3 in  Usman
 Winner:  Sebastian Kawa
 May 14 – 21: 2016 FAI Qualifying Sailplane GP #4 in  Varese
 Winner:  Peter Hartmann
 June 4 – 11: 2016 FAI Qualifying Sailplane GP #5 in  Rennes
 Winner:  Louis Bouderlique
 June 18 – 25: 2016 FAI Qualifying Sailplane GP #6 in  Niederöblarn
 Winner:  Boštjan Pristavec
 July 9 – 17: 2016 FAI Qualifying Sailplane GP #7 in  Bicester
 Winner:  Jan Omsels
 July 24 – 31: 2016 FAI Qualifying Sailplane GP #8 in  Ionia
 Winner:  Jerzy Szemplinski
 August 6 – 13: 2016 FAI Qualifying Sailplane GP #9 in  Ebersbach-Musbach
 Winner:  Matthias Sturm
 November 5 – 12: 7th FAI World Sailplane Grand Prix Championship in  Potchefstroom
 Winner:  Holger Karow

International Championships
 July 30 – August 13: 34th FAI World Gliding Championships in  Kaunas
 Standard class winner:  Louis Bouderlique
 Club class winner:  Jan Rothhardt
 20 metre Multi-Seat class winners:  (Duboc & Aboulin)

General aviation
 September 4 – 9: 20th FAI World Rally Flying Championship in  Santa Cruz
 Advanced Category winners: 
 Unlimited Category winners:

2016 Red Bull Air Race World Championship
 March 11 & 12: WARC #1 in  Abu Dhabi 
 Master Class winner:  Nicolas Ivanoff
 Challenger Class winner:  Daniel Ryfa
 April 23 & 24: WARC #2 in  Spielberg
 Master Class winner:  Matthias Dolderer
 Challenger Class winner:  Florian Berger
 June 4 & 5: WARC #3 in  Chiba
 Master Class winner:  Yoshihide Muroya
 Challenger Class winner:  Cristian Bolton
 July 16 & 17: WARC #4 in  Budapest
 Master Class winner:  Matthias Dolderer
 Challenger Class winner:  Daniel Ryfa
 August 13 & 14: WARC #5 in  Ascot
 Master Class winner:  Matt Hall
 Challenger Class winner:  Kevin Coleman
 September 3 & 4: WARC #6 in  Lausitzring
 Master Class winner:  Matt Hall
 Chellenger winner:  Florian Bergér
 October 1 & 2: WARC #7 in  Indianapolis
 Master Class winner:  Matthias Dolderer
 Chellenger winner:  Luke Czepiela
 October 15 & 16: WARC #9 in  Las Vegas
 Cancelled due to high winds.

Ballooning
 February 24 – 29: 3rd FAI European Hot Air Airship Championship in  Rottach-Egern
 Winner:  Jacques-Antoine Besnard (6875 points)
 June 24 – July 4: 3rd FAI Junior World Hot Air Balloon Championship in  Marijampole
 Winner:  Rokas Kostiuškevičius (17035 points)
 July 5 – 10: 2nd FAI Women's World Hot Air Balloon Championship in  Birštonas
 Winner:  Nicola Scaife (8713 points)
 July 21 – 24: 2016 Luxembourg Balloon Trophy in  Mersch
 Winners: 1.  Sven Göhler, 2.  Matthew Scaife, 3.  David Spildooren
 September 15 – 24: 60th Coupe Aéronautique Gordon Bennett in  Gladbeck
 Winners:  1 (Kurt Frieden & Pascal Witpraechtiger)
 2nd place:  2 (Nicolas Tièche & Laurent Sciboz)
 3rd place:  1 (Anulfo Gonzalez & Angel Aguirre)
 October 30 – November 7: 22nd FAI World Hot Air Balloon Championship in  Saga
 Winner:  Rhett Heartsill

Aerobatics
 May 28: 2016 Sky GP in  Durban
 Winner:  Patrick Davidson
 July 20 – 30: 7th FAI World Advanced Glider Aerobatic Championships in  Matkopuszta
 Winner:  Sebastian Jansson
 Team winners:  (Dávid Józsa, Miklós Hoós, Péter Szabó)
 July 20 – 30: 19th FAI World Glider Aerobatic Championships in  Matkopuszta
 Winner:  Ferenc Tóth
 Teams winners:  (Ferenc Tóth, János Szilágyi, János Sonkoly)
 August 4 – 14: 12th FAI World Advanced Aerobatic Championships in  Radom
 Winner:  Loïc Lovicourt
 Teams winners:  (Loïc Lovicourt, Romain Vienne, Benoît Faict)
 August 20 – 27: 20th FAI European Aerobatic Championships in  Moravská Třebová
 Winner:  Mikhail Mamistov
 Teams winner:  (Olivier Masurel, Mikael Brageot, Alexandre Orlowski)

Model aircraft
 April 11– 16: 2016 FAI F1D World Championships for Free Flight Indoor Model Aircraft in  Slănic
 Senior Individual winner:  Yuan Kang Lee
 Senior Teams winners:  (Istvan Botos, Dezso Orsovai, Zoltan Sukosd)
 Junior Individual winner:  Călin Bulai
 Junior Teams winners:  (Vladyslav Klymenko, Iurii Vytko, Denis Zhariy)
 May 7 – 13: 2016 FAI F2 World Championships for Control Line Model Aircraft in  Perth
 F2A winner:  Paul Eisner
 F2B winner:  Orestes Hernández
 F2C winners:  (Robert Fitzgerald & Mark Ellins)
 F2D winner:  Illia Rediuk
 July 20 – 24: 2016 FAI F1E European Championships for Free Flight Model Aircraft in  Turda
 Winner:  Franciszek Kanczok
 Teams winner: 
 July 22 – 31: 2016 FAI F3 European Championships for Model Helicopters in  Włocławek
 F3C winner:  Ennlo Graber
 F3N winner:  Eric Weber
 F3C Teams winners: 
 F3N Teams winners: 
 July 29 – August 6: 2016 FAI F3A European Championship for Aerobatic Model Aircraft in  Untermünkheim
 Winner:  Gernot Bruckmann
 Teams winner: 
 July 30 – August 6: 2016 FAI F3J World Championship for Model Gliders in  Vipava
 Senior winner:  Arijan Hucaljuk
 Junior winner:  Dillon Graves
 Senior Teams winner:  (Manuel Reinecke, Dominik Prestele, Ryan Höllein)
 Junior Teams winner:  (Max Finke, Jan Christoph Weihe, Felix Parsch)
 August 1 – 7: 2016 FAI F1 Junior World Championships for Free Flight Model Aircraft in  Prilep
 F1A winner:  Mickail Lomov
 F1B winner:  Dmytro Merzilakov
 F1P winner:  Daniel Bogomaz
 F1A Teams winner: 
 F1B Teams winner: 
 F1P Teams winner: 
 August 13 – 20: 2016 FAI F1 European Championships for Free Flight Model Aircraft in  Aradac/Zrenjanin
 F1A winner:  Roland Koglot
 F1B winner:  Aleksey Burdov
 F1C winner:  Artur Kaitschuk
 F1A Team winners: 
 F1B Team winners: 
 F1C Team winners: 
 August 13 – 20: 2016 FAI F5 World Championships for Electric Model Aircraft in  Lugo
 Winner:  Johannes Starzinger
 F5D winner:  Tomáš Andrlík
 Team winners:  (Johannes Starzinger, Karl Waser, Franz Riegler)
 Team F5D winners: 
 August 20 – 28: 2016 FAI F4 World Championships for Scale Model Aircraft in  Ploiești
 August 22 – 30: 2016 FAI S World Championships for Space Models in  Lviv
 Winner:  Robert Kreutz
 Team winners: 
 October 1 – 8: 2016 FAI F3A Asian-Oceanic Championship for Aerobatic Model Aircraft in  Taichung
 Winner:  Onda Tetsuo
 Junior winner:  Minemura Shoutaiou
 Team winners: 
 October 2 – 8: 2016 FAI F3 World Championship for Model Gliders in  Hanstholm
 Senior winner:  Arijan Hucaljuk
 Junior winner:  Dillon Graves
 Seniors Team winners: 
 Juniors Team winners: